Venteuges is a commune in the Haute-Loire department in south-central France.

Population

See also
Communes of the Haute-Loire department

References

Communes of Haute-Loire